Nuestra Señora de Lourdes, or Church of la Gruta de Lourdes, is a church in the city of Puebla, in the Mexican state of Puebla.

References

External links

 

Roman Catholic churches in Puebla (city)